Amir Khalifeh-Asl (born 5 May 1979) is an Iranian football player.

Club career
He served his golden days in Esteghlal Ahvaz.

Club career statistics

References

External links 
Persian League Profile

1979 births
Living people
Iranian footballers
Association football forwards
Foolad FC players
Fajr Sepasi players
Esteghlal Ahvaz players
Persian Gulf Pro League players
Azadegan League players